St. Edmund's Anglican Church was a parish of the Convocation of Anglicans in North America in Elm Grove, Wisconsin.

Formerly known as St. Edmund's Episcopal Church, the congregation became in 2008 the first in Wisconsin to withdraw from the Episcopal Church to join the Anglican realignment, a conservative movement of Anglicans in the United States and Canada formed primarily in opposition to the Episcopal Church's support for the ordination of non-celibate gay people.

History 
St. Edmund's was founded 1947 by a small group of Christian laity and clergy meeting in temporary facilities in the village of Elm Grove, Waukesha County, Wisconsin. Within a decade the group had raised sufficient funds to construct their own building on land donated to the congregation by members of their community on Watertown Plank Road in the village. In 1962, St. Edmund's voted to affiliate with the Episcopal Church in the United States of America and became part of the ECUSA Diocese of Milwaukee.
  
Bishop Donald Hallock granted St. Edmund's the charter of an earlier defunct parish in his diocese dedicated to St. Edmond (Edmund), King of East Anglia. The free grant of the charter provided the 15-year-old parish with honorific roots to Christian ministry in Milwaukee dating to 1874 and Anglican historical connections stretching back almost 1,100 years.

By 1976, the church was a congregation with more than 400 members. In 1976 the parish vestry chose Wayne Carr Olmstead to serve as rector. Olmstead remained in the position for the next 30 years, serving both the parishioners of St. Edmund's and young men studying for the ministry from Nashotah House Seminary. But his tenure proved controversial because of his high-church style and traditionalist theological approach, which limited the role of girls and women in church services. A large number of congregants left the parish in the years following Olmstead's appointment, including a substantial number of major donors, weakening its financial base. What remained was a smaller and more conservative group of worshippers.

After Olmstead died on March 13, 2006, the disconnect between the faith and practice of St. Edmund's Church, the Diocese of Milwaukee and the Episcopal Church.
In particular, the St. Edmund's congregation took issue with the Episcopal Church's acceptance of non-celibate gay people.

An absolute majority of St. Edmund's Church voted in December 2008 to remain within the Anglican Communion while disassociating itself completely from the Episcopal Church. The congregation was immediately received into the Convocation of Anglicans in North America, the American mission of the Church of Nigeria, the largest Anglican province in the world.

In December 2011, St. Edmund's lost a court case brought by the Episcopal Diocese of Milwaukee, and a judge ruled the parishioners must relinquish all church property and vacate the church building. They did so in January 2012, although the diocese accused the departing members of vandalizing the altar with Hebrew letters that approximated the words "God no longer lives here." Several graves on the church grounds were transferred elsewhere.

On January 26, 2014, the former St. Edmund's congregation was relaunched and renamed Holy Cross Anglican Church. On May 21, 2019, the diocese of Holy Cross came under the sole jurisdiction of the Anglican Church in North America and changed its name to the Anglican Diocese of the Living Word.

Building 

For more than 50 years, St. Edmund's was housed in a red clapboard and concrete church in the Mid-century Modern style.

Designed by architect William P. Wenzler and completed in 1957, the building on Watertown Plank Road in Elm Grove included one of the first hyperbolic paraboloid roofs in the United States. The roof was made of poured concrete and extended 45 feet beyond the altar, which was hung with a crucifix created in an abstract style and lit through natural light. 

According to Wenzler's daughter, the architect was nervous about whether or not the roof would stand, particularly after he received a comment on the blueprints from Spanish modernist architect Felix Candela, who was famous for his work with concrete. Candela wrote, "I won’t say it will fall, but if it stands it will be a coincidence." Wenzler's daughter writes that workmen on the building site were also terrified the roof would collapse, since its flexible shape meant it moved whenever someone walked on it.

Once finished, the building was well received by the architecture press and religious leaders of the time. Speaking shortly after the completion of the building, Wenzler said that new churches should not be "a shadow of the past, but an expression of the future."

After the final St. Edmunds Congregation left in 2012, the building remained empty until it was sold in 2015  to a newly formed Christian congregation, the Crimson Way church.  The new owners painted the clapboard exterior of the church's apse white.

Declaration of St. Edmund's Church 
The Declaration of St. Edmund's Church is an important document in the history of Anglicanism in the American Midwest as St. Edmund's was the first parish in Wisconsin to leave the Episcopal Church while remaining in the Anglican Communion.

See also
 Anglican Communion Network
 Anglo-Catholicism
 Mid-century modern Architecture

References

External links
CANA Official website
Decentralised nature of worldwide Anglicanism
Holy Cross Anglican Church, CANA of Milwaukee, WI

Anglicanism
Churches in Waukesha County, Wisconsin